Jadu may refer to:

 The software company Jadu
 The Libyan village Jadu
 The South Korean rock band The Jadu
 The German musician Jadu
 The Asian fruit tree Prunus salicina